St Margaret's Church is a Grade II* listed parish church in the Church of England Diocese of Norwich in Felbrigg, Norfolk.

History
The church is medieval with later additions. Built of flint with stone and brick dressings. The tower dates from ca. 1410 and was built by Sir Simon de Felbrigg. Although a village was originally located  around the church, in the 16th century following an outbreak of the plague the village was rebuilt in a new location to the north-east, leaving the church isolated.

Parish status
The church is in a joint benefice with:
St Mary's Church, Roughton, Norfolk
St Andrew's Church, Metton, Norfolk
St Peter and St Paul's Church, Sustead, Norfolk
St Mary's Church, Bessingham, Norfolk
St Bartholomew's Church, Hanworth, Norfolk

Memorials

Simon de Felbrigg d. 1351 and his wife Alice, daughter of Sir George de Thorpe, Kt., Lord of the Manor of Breisworth, Suffolk
Roger de Felbrigg d. 1380 and his wife Elizabeth de Scales
Sir Simon Felbrigg d. 1442 and his first wife Margaret d. 1416 (daughter of Przemyslaus I Noszak, Duke of Cieszyn)
Thomas Windham d. 1599
Jane Coningsby d. 1608
Thomas Windham d. 1653 by Martin Morley of Norwich 
Joan Windham d. 1669
John Windham d. 1676
William Windham d. 1689 by Grinling Gibbons
Ashe Windham d. 1749
William Windham d. 1762
William Windham d. 1810 by Joseph Nollekens 1813
Cecilia Federica Marina Windham d. 1824
Henry Baring d. 1848
Vice Admiral William Windham d. 1833
William Howe Windham d. 1854
Lady Elizabeth Caroline Sophia Giubilei (formerly Windham, née Hervey) d. 1863 (daughter of Frederick Hervey, 1st Marquess of Bristol)
Wyndham Cremer Ketton-Cremer d. 1933 and Emily his wife d. 1952
Flying Officer Richard Thomas Ketton-Cremer d. 1941
Robert Wyndham Ketton-Cremer d. 1969

Organ

The organ is thought to be by Lewis & Co and was originally in St Botolph's Church, Banningham. It was installed at Felbrigg in 1997 by Holmes & Swift. A specification of the organ can be found in the National Pipe Organ Register.

References

Felbrigg
Felbrigg
St Margaret's Church